The 230-class locomotives are a number of classes of metre gauge steam locomotives in use on Vietnam Railways. The description '230' refers to their 4-6-0 wheel arrangement.

Several sub-classes have been identified for this wheel arrangement, including the 230-001, 230-301 and 230-401 types.

References

4-6-0 locomotives
Steam locomotives of Vietnam